Robinsonekspedisjonen 2022 is the seventeenth and final season of the Norwegian reality television series Robinsonekspedisjonen. This season, 20 Norwegians compete against each other in Langkawi, Malaysia to win 500,000 kroner. The main twist this season is Kembali, where contestants go after they're voted off. They compete in duels against each other for a chance to earn their spot back in the game. The season premiered on 5 September 2022 and concluded on 6 December 2022 when Are Lundby Kvaal won against Liselotte Petersen and Andreas Carlsen to claim the grand prize and the title of Robinson 2022.

Contestants

References

External links

2021
2022 Norwegian television series endings